Guillermo José "Willy" Montesinos Serrano (born 10 January 1948) is a Spanish actor who has appeared in more than 50 films in his career.

Biography 
Montesinos graduated in Dramatic Art in 1969 from Madrid. He made his acting debut in 1975. He went on to appear in successful films like La vaquilla (1984), La vida alegre (1987), Mujeres al borde de un ataque de nervios (1988), latter of which was directed by Pedro Almodóvar.

His television roles include Pero ¿esto qué es? (1990-1991), Los ladrones van a la oficina (1993-1995) Contigo pan y cebolla (1997).

Filmography 
 Viva la vida (Película) (2019)
 Tercera Edad - (Cortometraje) (2018)
 Locos por el sexo (2006)
 Rojo sangre (2004)
 París-Tombuctú (1999)
 Todos a la cárcel (1993)
 Supernova (1993)
 El hombre de la nevera (1993)
 Disparate nacional (1990)
 Ni se te ocurra... (1990)
 Si te dicen que caí (1989)
 Amanece, que no es poco (1989)
 Mujeres al borde de un ataque de nervios (1988)
 La vida alegre (1987)
 Sé infiel y no mires con quién (1985)
 La corte de Faraón (1985)
 Luces de bohemia (1985)
 La vaquilla (1985)
 El pico 2 (1984)
 Los zancos (1984)
 Últimas tardes con Teresa (1984)
 Juana la loca... de vez en cuando (1983)
 J.R. contraataca (1983)
 Que nos quiten lo bailao (1983)
 Le llamaban J.R. (1982)
 Buscando a Perico (1982)
 Femenino singular (1982)
 Buenas noches, señor monstruo (1982)
 Las aventuras de Enrique y Ana (1981)
 Gary Cooper, que estás en los cielos (1980)
 El crimen de Cuenca (1980)
 Siete días de enero (1979)
 La Carmen (1976)

Theatre 
thumb|El actor Guillermo "Willy" Montesinos.
Lista incompleta

 Dinamita (2016-2017)
 Un Enemigo del Pueblo (2015-2016-2017)
 Orquesta Club Virginia (2012)
 Ceniza (2011)
 El extraño viaje (2011)
 El galán fantasma (2010)
 5 gays.com (2005)
 Que usted lo mate bien (2002)
 Rosa de dos aromas (2002; como director)
 Ay, caray (1999-2000)
 Las obras completas de William Shakespeare (1997)
 Tócala otra vez, Sam! (1989)
 La Reina del Nilo (1986)
 La ilustre fregona (1982)
 De san Pascual a san Gil (1979)

Television 
 La mujer de tu vida (1990)
 Los ladrones van a la oficina (1993-1996)
 Tarancón, el quinto mandamiento (2011)
 La que se avecina (2014)
 Cuéntame (2015-2016-2017)
 L'Alqueria Blanca (2007-2010)

Awards and nominations

References

External links 

Male actors from Madrid
Living people
Spanish film actors
Spanish television actors
1948 births